Academia Romana may refer to:
 Academia Romana (Italy), an Italian academy established in the 15th Century by Julius Pomponius Laetus
 Romanian Academy, known in Romanian as Academia Română, a cultural forum founded in 1866, covering the scientific, artistic and literary domains